Jin-sun, also spelled Jin-seon, is a Korean masculine name. The meaning differs based on the hanja used to write each syllable of the given name. There are 43 hanja with the reading "jin" and 41 hanja with the reading "sun" on the South Korean government's official list of hanja which may be registered for use in given names.

People with this name include:
Kim Jin-sun (born 1946), South Korean politician, former governor of Gangwon-do
Yoo Jin-sun (born 1962), South Korean tennis player
Jung Jin-sun (born 1984), South Korean fencer

See also
List of Korean given names
Kim Jin-sun (fencer) (born 1968), South Korean female fencer, whose given name has a different vowel (진순)

References

Korean masculine given names